Sea of Storms may refer to:

Sea of Storms (Wheel of Time), a location in the Wheel of Time fantasy series by Robert Jordan
Oceanus Procellarum (Latin for "Ocean of Storms"), a large lunar mare on the Moon
A location in the video game The Settlers II

See also

 
 Stormy Sea (disambiguation)
 Storm (disambiguation)
 Sea (disambiguation)